Cad and the Dandy is an independent tailoring company based in London, England with premises on Savile Row, in the City and New York City, that sells bespoke suits.

History
Cad and the Dandy was founded in 2008 James Sleater and Ian Meiers, two former bankers. They met through a supplier, as both pursued a similar business idea independently, and agreed to start the company together, each contributing £20,000 of initial capital. Both had family connections to the tailoring industry, giving them knowledge helpful in launching the new company.

After initially conducting fittings in rented office space, they came to an arrangement with Chittleborough & Morgan to allow appointments in their shop on Savile Row. In October 2009, the company opened its first permanent store in the City of London.

The company had a turnover of £1.3M in 2010, and was listed by The Guardian in the Courvoisier Future 500. In July 2010 the founders won the Bento Entrepreneur of the Year Award at the Macworld Awards and in July 2013 they opened permanent premises on Savile Row.

In 2018, Cad and The Dandy opened a New York store, on W 57th St, and also bought Götrich, Scandinavia's oldest tailoring house.

Operations
Based in London, Cad & the Dandy employs more than 30 tailors in three workshops. The company launched a new flagship store at 13 Savile Row in June 2013. The store is the first on the tailoring street to hand-weave a cloth before making it up into a fully finished suit. The company established an apprenticeship programme for would-be tailors in London.

References

See also
Suitsupply
Savile Row tailoring

Clothing companies based in London
British suit makers
Clothing companies of England
Clothing retailers of England
Savile Row Bespoke Association members
Shops in London
British companies established in 2008
Clothing companies established in 2008
Retail companies established in 2008
2008 in London
2008 establishments in England
Clothing brands of the United Kingdom